Le silence de la forêt is a 2003 Central African Republican-Cameroonian drama film directed by Bassek Ba Kobhio and Didier Ouenangare. It is historically the first ever feature film in the Cinema of the Central African Republic. The film was also co-produced in Gabon and Cameroon. The film is adapted based on a novel written by Étienne Goyémidé with the same title Le silence de la forêt. The film was based on the ethnic minority group of African Pygmies and it is also the first film to significantly address the racism of modern Africans towards indigenous ethnic African Biaka people.

Synopsis 
Gonaba (Eriq Ebouaney), a regional educational inspector in the Central African Republic feels frustrated and disheartened after working in a military regime for over a decade. He soon becomes interested in advocating for indigenous tribal ethnic group called Baaka who are generally ignored and ill-treated in the society and whose existence is often threatened by the urbanization and economic development.

Cast 

 Eriq Ebouaney as Gonaba
 Nadège Beausson-Diagne as Simone
 Sonia Zembourou as Kali
 Philippe Mory as Prefect

Production 
The film was initially announced to be directed solely by Central African Republic based filmmaker Didier Ouenangare as his debut directorial venture. He made his directorial debut through this project at the age of 50. However Cameroonian director Bassek Ba Kobhio joined the filming and took charge of the technical aspect of the shooting. Bassek eventually became the main director of the film while Didier served as his co-director of the film. Both of them mutually agreed to work together and the film was funded to large extent by Cameroon and Gabon. The film was made in CAR at a time when the country faced economic crisis coupled with the military coup in 2003. It was revealed that the filmmaker Didier received a grant of amounting to 50000 FF from the Agence intergouvernmentale de la francophonie during the Amiens Film Festival.

Most of the cast members and technicians for the filming process were recruited from fellow neighbouring nations including Cameroon and Gabon. Cameroonian actor Eriq Ebouaney was roped into play the lead role and he had to learn the Sango language which is one of the official languages of Central African Republic. Cameroonian veteran music composer Manu Dibango was roped into score music for the film. The film director Didier also received opposition and criticism for not choosing Central Africans to work for the film.

Release 
The film's domestic theatrical release in Central African Republic was disrupted as the only cinema in the country was closed at that time. The film was officially selected to be screened in few film festivals and opened to generally positive reviews from critics. The film was premiered at the Planet Africa section of the 2003 Toronto International Film Festival. It was also selected to be screened as a part of the Directors' Fortnight section of the 2003 Cannes Film Festival. The film also received special mention at the 2003 Festival International du Film Francophone de Namur (FIFF).

See also 

 List of Cameroonian films
 List of Gabonese films

References

External links 

 
 

2003 films
Cameroonian drama films
English-language Cameroonian films
2000s French-language films
2003 drama films
Films about racism
2003 directorial debut films
Central African films